Grondona (Grondonn-a in Ligurian) is a comune (municipality) in the Province of Alessandria in the Italian region Piedmont, located about  southeast of Turin and about  southeast of Alessandria.

The municipality of Grondona contains the frazione (subdivision) Variana.

Grondona borders the following municipalities: Arquata Scrivia, Borghetto di Borbera, Isola del Cantone, Roccaforte Ligure, and Vignole Borbera.

Demographic evolution

References

Cities and towns in Piedmont